Camp Lyon, sometimes called Fort Lyon, was established in 1862 during the Bald Hills War midway between Fort Anderson and Fort Baker.  It was a temporary California Volunteer post located at Brehmer's Ranch on the Mad River, about 20 miles southeast of Arcata, California near Kneeland, California.  Company K, 2nd Regiment California Volunteer Infantry was ordered to Camp Lyon December, 1861, and served there until the fort was abandoned 

With the abandonment of Fort Lyon, Fort Anderson took over its area of responsibility to meet that of Fort Baker.

References

External links 
  The War of the Rebellion: Volume 35, Part 1 CORRESPONDENCE, ORDERS, AND RETURNS RELATING TO OPERATIONS ON THE PACIFIC COAST FROM JULY 1, 1862, TO JUNE 30, 1865. By United States. War Dept, Robert Nicholson Scott, Henry Martyn WASHINGTON: GOVERNMENT PRINTING OFFICE. 1897
  Records of California men in the war of the rebellion 1861 to 1867 By California. Adjutant General's Office, SACRAMENTO: State Office, J. D. Young, Supt. State Printing. 1890.

Former populated places in California
California in the American Civil War
American Civil War army posts
Bald Hills War
1862 establishments in California